Quisqualamine is the α-decarboxylated analogue of quisqualic acid, as well as a relative of the neurotransmitters glutamate and γ-aminobutyric acid (GABA). α-Decarboxylation of excitatory amino acids can produce derivatives with inhibitory effects. Indeed, unlike quisqualic acid, quisqualamine has central depressant and neuroprotective properties and appears to act predominantly as an agonist of the GABAA receptor and also to a lesser extent as an agonist of the glycine receptor, due to the facts that its actions are inhibited in vitro by GABAA antagonists like bicuculline and picrotoxin and by the glycine antagonist strychnine, respectively. Mg2+ and DL-AP5, NMDA receptor blockers, CNQX, an antagonist of both the AMPA and kainate receptors, and 2-hydroxysaclofen, a GABAB receptor antagonist, do not affect quisqualamine's actions in vitro, suggesting that it does not directly affect the ionotropic glutamate receptors or the GABAB receptor in any way. Whether it binds to and acts upon any of the metabotropic glutamate receptors like its analogue quisqualic acid however is unclear.

See also 
 Quisqualic acid
 Muscimol

References 

Amines
Anticonvulsants
Ureas
Oxadiazolidines
Carbamates
Glycine receptor agonists
GABAA receptor agonists